Vladimir Vladimirovich Yakushev (born 14 June 1968) is a Russian politician serving as the Presidential Plenipotentiary Representative in the Ural Federal District since 9 November 2020.

Previously, he was Minister of Construction, Housing and Utilities from 18 May 2018 to 9 November 2020, and Governor of Tyumen Oblast from 2005 to 2018.

Early life and career
Vladimir Yakushev was born in Neftekamsk on 14 June 1968. At age 7, he moved with his family to his father in Nadym, where he graduated from school.

From 1986 to 1988, he served in the Army.

In 1993, he graduated from University of Tyumen with a degree in law.

Banking career
On 27 June 1993, Yakushev started his career as a legal adviser of the Yamal-Nenets branch of the West Siberian Commercial Bank (Zapsibcombank).

On 25 July 1994, he became acting Director of the Yamal-Nenets branch of the Zapsibcombank, and on 24 January 1995, he became Director of the Yamal-Nenets branch of the Zapsibcombank.

In 1997, he became Vice-President and Director of Salekhard branch of Zapsibcombank. He graduated from University of Tyumen with a degree in economy.

On 29 April 1998, he became President of Zapsibcombank.

Political career

On 13 June 2001, Yakushev became vice governor of Tyumen Oblast.

In March 2005, he became the first deputy mayor of Tyumen, and from March 21 he served as acting mayor of Tyumen.

On 24 November 2005, Yakushev became governor of Tyumen Oblast.

On 2 October 2010, he was re-appointed as governor.

On 14 September 2014, he was re-elected governor for a third term, gaining 87.3% of the votes in the first round.

On 18 May 2018, he was appointed Minister of Construction, Housing and Utilities in Medvedev's second cabinet. On 21 January 2020, he was re-appointed to this office in Mishustin's cabinet.

On 1 May, Yakushev was hospitalized after being diagnosed with COVID-19. This happened the day after Prime Minister Mikhail Mishustin was also diagnosed with the coronavirus. On 26 May, Yakushev recovered and returned to the exercise of his powers.

Family
Yakushev's wife is Larisa Yakusheva, born on 1 January 1963. They married while he was studying at university. Yakushev has two children: a son, Pavel, and a daughter, Natalia.

Awards
Order of Honour (2008)
Medal of Nikolay Ozerov (2013)
Medal of Honor "For Merits in Protection of Children of Russia" (2014)

References

1968 births
Living people
1st class Active State Councillors of the Russian Federation
People from Neftekamsk
21st-century Russian politicians
United Russia politicians
Mayors of Tyumen
Governors of Tyumen Oblast
Government ministers of Russia
Tyumen State University alumni
Russian individuals subject to the U.S. Department of the Treasury sanctions